Christmas Favorites may refer to:

Christmas Favorites (Il Volo EP), 2011
Christmas Favorites (Sara Niemietz EP), 2012
Christmas Favorites, a 1991 album by Elvis Presley and Jim Reeves